Cololabis is a genus of sauries found in the eastern and northern Pacific Ocean.  The name is derived from the Greek word kolos, meaning "short", and the Latin word labis, meaning "forceps", referring to the short beak of the type species Scombresox brevirostris.

Species
There are currently two recognized species in this genus:
 Cololabis adocetus J. E. Böhlke, 1951 (Saury)
 Cololabis saira Brevoort, 1856 (Pacific saury)

References

 
Scomberesocidae
Taxa named by Theodore Gill
Marine fish genera